Silicone Valley may refer to:

 A misspelling of Silicon Valley, nickname for the Santa Clara Valley, also known as the South Bay area of San Francisco, the location of many American high tech companies
 Silicone Valley (San Fernando Valley), a pioneering region for the pornography industry; nickname coined as a pun on Silicon Valley, but referring to silicone breast implants rather than silicon chips
 Strahinjića Bana in Dorćol (a neighborhood of Belgrade, Serbia), because it is frequented by many "trophy" women (allegedly with breast implants)
 "Press Enter ■", a novella by John Varley in which one of the characters refers to mammary intercourse with her breast implants as "touring the silicone valley"